Alberto Andrea Paleari (born 29 August 1992) is an Italian professional footballer who plays as a goalkeeper for Serie B club Benevento.

Club career

Early career
Born in Giussano, Lombardy, Paleari started his career at hometown club Seregno. In June 2008 he signed for Serie A club a.C. Milan. He was the starting keeper of Primavera under-20 team from 2008–09 to 2010–11 season. In 2010, he was second graded in the Italian championship losing the last match with Atalanta team. In 2011, he reached the first team, coached by Massimiliano Allegri, with number 61.

In the lower leagues
In August 2011, Paleari signed for Serie D club Pontisola. In the 2011–12 season he played 37 matches for Pontisola, which placed second in its round.

In summer 2012, he left for Lega Pro club Tritium.

In 2013, he joined Virtus Verona. He played 34 matches and won the award for "Best Goalkeeper of the Year", announced by the three most important national sports daily newspapers.

In July 2014, he moved to Mantova, where he collected two matches in Coppa Italia and one in his round.

Genoa
On 2 October 2020, he joined Serie A club Genoa on loan with an obligation to buy. He made his Serie A debut on 30 November 2020 against Parma.

Benevento
On 17 July 2021, he moved to Benevento on loan with an option to buy and a conditional obligation to buy. On 17 June 2022, Benevento exercised their option to buy.

International career
Paleari was part of Italy squad at 2013 and 2015 Summer Universiade. In 2013, he played with no. 22 and in 2015 with no. 1.
In the 2015 edition, Paleari and his teammates won the gold medal against South of Korea.

References 

1992 births
Living people
People from Giussano
Footballers from Lombardy
Italian footballers
Italy youth international footballers
A.C. Milan players
A.C. Ponte San Pietro Isola S.S.D. players
Tritium Calcio 1908 players
Mantova 1911 players
A.S. Cittadella players
Genoa C.F.C. players
Benevento Calcio players
Serie A players
Serie B players
Serie C players
Serie D players
Association football goalkeepers
Universiade medalists in football
Universiade gold medalists for Italy
Medalists at the 2015 Summer Universiade
Sportspeople from the Province of Monza e Brianza